The LPGA Corning Classic was an annual golf tournament for professional female golfers on the LPGA Tour. It took place every year from 1979 through 2009 at the Corning Country Club in Corning, New York.

It was one of the longest running tournaments on the LPGA Tour and the longest with a single sponsor. The title sponsor since the beginning was Corning Incorporated, an American manufacturer of glass, ceramics and related materials, primarily for industrial and scientific applications.

Production and operation of the tournament was a large community effort by the citizens of Corning.  As with most tournaments on the LPGA Tour, proceeds went to charity.  Beneficiaries of the Corning Classic were local hospitals and camps for disabled children. Net charitable proceeds since 1979 exceeded $5 million.

On April 20, 2009, the Classic's title sponsor, Corning Incorporated, announced it would not be able to sponsor the tournament after the 2009 tournament. The tournament's executives confirmed that efforts to secure additional sponsors had been unsuccessful and that the tournament would not continue after 2009.

Tournament names through the years: 
1979-1983: Corning Classic
1984-2009: LPGA Corning Classic

Winners

* Championship won in sudden-death playoff.

Tournament record

References

External links
Tournament results (1979-2009) at GolfObserver.com
LPGA official tournament microsite

Former LPGA Tour events
Golf in New York (state)
Corning, New York
Recurring sporting events established in 1979
Recurring sporting events disestablished in 2009
1979 establishments in New York (state)
2009 disestablishments in New York (state)
History of women in New York (state)